The Second term of Edmund Ho Hau Wah as Chief Executive of Macau, officially considered part of "The 2nd term Chief Executive of Macau", relates to the period of governance of Macau since the transfer of sovereignty of Macau, between 20 December 2004 and 	20 December 2009. Edmund Ho Hau Wah was reelected in mid 2004 by 300-member Selection Committee.

Cabinet

Ministry
The policy bureaux were under several reorganisations during the term as following:

|}

Executive Council members
The Executive Council was presided by President Edmund Ho Hau Wah and consisted of total 10 members. All members are appointed by the Chief Executive from among members of the Legislative Council and other influential public personnels.

The Convenor of the members was Tang Chi Kin.

See also
 First term of Edmund Ho as Chief Executive of Macau

References

Government of Macau